Ralph Harris may refer to:
 Ralph Harris, Baron Harris of High Cross (1924–2006), British economist
 Ralph Harris (comedian), American comedian, actor, and writer
 Ralph C. Harris, architect
 Ralph Harris (journalist), former Reuters White House correspondent

See also
 Rolf Harris (born 1930), Australian musician, composer, painter, and television host